The 1970 Vanderbilt Commodores football team represented Vanderbilt University in the 1970 NCAA University Division football season. The Commodores were led by head coach Bill Pace in his fourth season and finished the season with a record of four wins and seven losses (4–7 overall, 1–5 in the SEC).

Schedule

References

Vanderbilt
Vanderbilt Commodores football seasons
Vanderbilt Commodores football